Mesquite Bosque is a vegetative association within the Southwestern United States, under the Kuchler scheme of plant association categories.

Geography
The Mesquite Bosque association occurs in the Sonoran Desert, with mesquite (Prosopis spp.) dominating. In some cases, this plant association is along xeric portions of desert floodplains, bajadas, and arroyos.

Plant species
The mesquite (Prosopis) species include:
Velvet mesquite - Prosopis velutina
Screwbean mesquite - Prosopis pubescens - "Tornillo"
Honey mesquite - Prosopis glandulosa

Other species include:
Catclaw acacia - Acacia greggii
Fremont cottonwood - Populus fremontii
Desert mistletoe - Phoradendron californicum
California fan palm - Washingtonia filifera - the Mesquite Bosque association is one of the Kuchler scheme designation areas where this endangered palm may occur.

Gallery

See also
 Bosque
 Tamaulipan mezquital

References

Plant communities of the Western United States
.Mesquite Bosque
Deserts and xeric shrublands